Hathangaon is a village in tehsil Punhana in Nuh district of Haryana in India. This village is situated in 12 km from Punhana.

Nearby villages 
 Nai
 Neheda
 Naugaon
 Bichor
 Aminabad
 Samshabad

Demographics
As of 2011 India census, Hathangaon had a population of 3706 in 537 households. Males (1956) constitute 52.7%  of the population and females (1750) 47.23%. Hathangaon has an average literacy (1585) rate of 42.76%, less than the national average of 74%: male literacy (1065) is 67.19%, and female literacy (520) is 32.8%. In Hathangaon, 19.77% of the population is under 6 years of age (733).

References

External links
 Mewat Development Society (MDS)
 MDA.nic.in
 Mewat.gov.in

Villages in Nuh district